The 2023 Fitzgibbon Cup was the 106th staging of the Fitzgibbon Cup since its establishment by the Gaelic Athletic Association in 1912. It is sponsored by Electric Ireland, and known as the Electric Ireland HE GAA Fitzgibbon Cup for sponsorship purposes. The draw for the group stage fixtures took place on 14 December 2022. The cup ran from 18 January to 18 February 2023.

University of Limerick were the defending champions.

The Fitzgibbon Cup final was played on 18 February 2023 at the SETU Waterford Complex, between University of Limerick and University of Galway, in what was their second consecutive meeting in the final. University of Limerick won the match by 4-19 to 1-13 to claim their eighth Fitzgibbon Cup title overall and a second title in succession.

University of Galway's Evan Niland was the top scorer with 1-52.

Group A

Group A table

Group A fixtures and results

Group B

Group B table

Group B fixtures and results

Group C

Group C table

Group C fixtures and results

Group D

Group D table

Group D fixtures and results

Knockout stage

Quarter-finals

Semi-finals

Final

Statistics

Top scorers

Overall

In a single game

References

External link
 Higher Education fixtures and results

Fitzgibbon
Fitzgibbon Cup